The Loufoulakari Falls lie 80 km south west of Brazzaville in the Republic of the Congo at the confluence of the Loufoulakari River and the Congo River.

Waterfalls of the Republic of the Congo